A dead-end job is a job where there is little or no chance of career development and advancement into a better position. If an individual requires further education to progress within their firm that is difficult to obtain for any reason, this can result in the occupation being classified as a dead-end position. Based on human resources and career strategist Toni Howard Lowe, some individuals who have worked for the same company for several years may not be privy to the signs that they are currently employed in a dead-end job.

Possible indicators

Within a large company as a subordinate 
 Lacking any passion or feeling no challenge in the daily activities of a job, which compromises job performance and efficiency due to a lack of motivation.
 Being hampered by the presence of a glass ceiling that prohibits advancement in a firm.
 Not being able to visualize any opportunities for growth in a current position.
 Working at a firm in financial distress.
 The responsibilities of the position have not changed within the last three years.
 One is not actively chosen for high-profile projects, committees, and is passed over for a promotion or has experienced a demotion in your title.
 The strategic direction of the company has changed and, in turn, one's function within the firm has been minimized or phased out.
 The relationships with management and fellow co-workers are continuously deteriorating, regardless of attempts to rectify the scarred relationships.
 There is much  turnover in one's position.
 Complaints of job dissatisfaction within the firm fall on deaf ears.
 There is risk of one's occupation being made obsolete by automation.

Examples

Occupations

Miscellaneous occupations 

Dead-end work is usually regarded as unskilled and the phrase usually applies to those working as shelf stackers, cleaners, call center agents, clerks, or in other menial jobs where the pay is low, and the hours are long. Furthermore, positions not regarded as menial may nonetheless qualify as dead-end jobs and forms of underemployment. A specialized employee working in a small firm in an underdeveloped local market, for example, might have few opportunities for advancement within the company while simultaneously facing a dearth of opportunities outside it. Most dead-end jobs offer little to no transferable skills and may hinder workers from pursuing careers in other companies. Dead-end jobs such as an internal auditing position within a firm, according to CFO.com, should only be considered and accepted if an individual has a pre-calculated exit strategy so that one is not stuck permanently within a position of no opportunities. Law librarians and individuals who join firms that are enlisted into estate or trust work consist of low paying occupations which translate to dead-end jobs with no opportunities of growth.

Few fast-food franchise employees receive any type of work benefits and their wages are so low that they are unable to make enough income to supply themselves with life's basic necessities, especially if they are employed part-time.  Part-time employees often need to work two to three jobs to make ends meet or require government assistance in the form of food stamps at the expense of other taxpayers to live.  Most of these fast-food positions are considered dead-end jobs because of the traits listed above, in addition to the lack of opportunities within the fast-food realm, and the inability to organize to improve their working conditions.  Presently, any positive modification to the wages and benefits for low paid fast-food employees to make the occupation more appealing could signal a movement consisting of a mass firing of employees in favor of kiosks and robots.  As Andrew Puzder, former CEO of Carl's Jr. and Hardee's, stated: "Robots and kiosks are always polite, they always upsell, they never take a vacation, they never show up late, there's never a slip-and-fall, or an age, sex, or race discrimination case."

Dead-end jobs are not limited to menial labor, retail or fast food roles. Professional positions in call centers, loss-mitigation underwriting, administrative and clerical work may also offer almost no advancement potential.

Medical field occupations 

A survey was conducted in Scotland to obtain feedback on issues regarding education and professional topics.  The results revealed that only one out of 25 Registered Mental Nurses (RMNs) would recommend other individuals in pursuing their profession.  Over half of the participants in the survey mentioned that they have reached their career's highest level. Additionally, 'reprofiling exercises' and skill mix activities conducted within this profession has led to a decrease of registered nurses within the industry.  66% of the respondents also stated that their organizations provide no opportunities to grow despite being interested in progressing within their career.  One out of six participants exclaimed that the position of a Register Mental Nurse is a dead-end job due to the reasons above in addition to there being no clear direction for their career path.  Because of these downfalls, nurses who have reached their highest capacity demonstrate more signs of despondency about their career path compared to their counterparts employed at lower increments.

A job residing within the realm of medical inspection is also considered a dead-end job.  There is an absence of progression in the areas of status, responsibilities, and salary for this current field of work.  SMOs or School Medical Officers have experienced dissatisfaction with the lack of progression as described above, in addition to the redundancy of work-related activities.  The responsibility of medical inspection of school children encompasses mainly of the routine inspection of a large population of children and presents very little to no feature of the greater interest in medicine.  The starting salary of these workers is low and inadequate, and they are not supplemented with any substantial raises to compensate their low starting salaries.

Certified Nursing Assistants (CNAs), also known as long-term care workers, represent the frontline workers who assist individuals with disabilities with instrumental activities such as using the phone and daily activities such as bathing or eating.  It is a challenge to recruit them and retain them as employees.  According to the American Health Care Association, in 2002, there was a turnover rate for this occupation in nursing homes of 71% per year.  CNAs earned a median hourly wage of only $10.04 in 2004 which is slightly higher than other occupations such as grocery cashiers ($7.90 in 2004) and fast food cooks ($7.07 in 2004).  They also receive very few fringe benefits.  Approximately 16% of CNAs do not have health insurance provided by their firms.  Inadequate training provided to the CNAs in addition to low levels of education also can affect job tenure within their position, causing a lack of opportunities to grow and learn new material.  Because of the reasons above, the position of CNA is also considered a dead-end occupation.

Temporary employment/short-term contracts 
In Europe, temporary employment is utilized frequently and represents the heart of political and economic debates.  These temporary contracts and job positions allow an increase in labor market flexibility and providing employers with the ability to dodge strict government regulations regarding the firing and hiring of employees as well as avoid regulations concerning fringe and pay benefits.  Previous research confirmed that a wage penalty existed with the utilization of fixed-term contracts.  This wage penalty was applied to young workers entering an occupation with low human capital investments and lasted for the first few years of employment but could lead to a pay off if the worker is viewed as highly productive in their occupation when pursuing a permanent contract.  This is known as the learning effect and can be quite large.  This form of contract can be a considered a dead-end job if the worker is unable to meet the demands necessary by the employer or company.  A study was performed within the United Kingdom and Germany on the topic of temporary employment conducted by fixed-term contracts.  The study indicated that for fixed-term contracts, some jobs consisting of a fixed-term contract can lead to permanent employment with good benefits and exist as a stepping stone, while others lead employees within a series of different fixed-term contracts and positions with little room for improvement which, in essence, is another form of a dead-end job.

In countries such as Italy, Spain, and France, there is a dramatic increase of temporary positions and short-term contracts due to the benefit of being able to lay off temporary employees without restrictions or incurring statutory redundancy payments.  Because of this, the number of temporary workers within the workforce has doubled between the years of 1985 and 1997.  Temporary jobs do come at a cost.  There is concern about lack of opportunities for career advancement for temporary workers in addition to the quality of these types of occupations.  Case study information has been discovered confirming that employer enthusiasm within the workplace has decreased due to the utilization of temporary jobs with dead-end characteristics which resulted in low levels of motivation and retention of such employees within a firm.

A study was conducted by Alison L. Booth, Marco Francesconi and Jeff Frank which concluded that individuals participating in seasonal, casual or fixed-term employment report that they have not received the work-related training necessary for the occupation and experience lower levels of job satisfaction in comparison to permanent ones.  The study concluded that there is evidence that temporary jobs can be a stepping stone to a permanent job within a firm.  The median time within a temporary position before such a switch is between 18 months and 3 and a half years and depends upon the gender of the individual and the type of contract (whether it is a fixed-term or seasonal contract).  Seasonal/casual positions yield very little chance of obtaining a permanent position and can be categorized as dead-end positions.  Fixed-term contracts have a larger potential of being transitioned into a permanent one, however, males suffer a permanent earning loss during the transition in comparison to males who started in a permanent position from the beginning.  Females, however, within a fixed-term position fully catch up to the wages of their permanent position counterparts.

History
Since the 1970s, occupations within many industrialized nations such as the United States have become less secure.  As the traditional job hierarchies within a firm deteriorate and companies downsize due to unexpected circumstances such as a recession, or employer changes both involuntary and voluntary, the reduction in security in firms become more frequent.  Instead of residing under one employer and being promoted within the one company, employees are climbing the corporate ladder by switching between employers.  Because of this, many employees cannot expect to reside within the same firm for the next 15 to 20 years.  Based on research results conducted by Anne-Kathrin Kronberg within the Emory University, the externalization of job mobility affects gender disparities depending upon whether individuals work in bad or good occupations in addition to whether they leave their firms voluntary or not.  If an individual leaves a job voluntarily, then the gender gap closes the fastest within a benign occupation, while a dead-end job has stagnant results.  If a worker leaves a job involuntarily, gender disparities run narrow within bad jobs.  For good jobs, the gender gap closes initially but opens again swiftly in the 1990s.   The study's definition of "good" or "bad" was whether the occupation provided pension plans and health insurance to their employees in addition to whether the individual's earnings were above the federal poverty threshold of 120 percent.

Before 1990, individuals with disabilities were subject to discrimination by being denied equal job opportunities, companies failing to provide such individuals with reasonable accommodations, being assigned to dead-end classified occupations and underutilization as a whole.  The phrase an "individual with a disability" references a person who has either a mental or physical impairment that limits the ability to perform one or several major life activities, or is regarded to have or has had a record of an impairment or disability.  On July 26, 1992, the Americans with Disabilities Act of 1990 (ADA) was implemented and took effect to assist individuals with disabilities by eliminating such employment barriers so that they could fully participate in society and receive the same job opportunities that any other individual would receive.

Psychological effects
One possible side effect of being stationed in a dead-end job for too long is the feeling of a lack of motivation and boredom. Another possible side effect can be a short temper, replacing the patience that the worker once had when first starting the position.  The lack of motivation experienced by individuals within a dead-end job can lead to discouragement in the direction of their career path and can cause their level of performance to suffer by either taking longer to complete a certain activity or task and/or making more mistakes than usual due to a lack of concentration.

All of these characteristics can lead an individual to an occupational crisis state.  Occupational crisis consists of an individual demonstrating a state of mixed negative thoughts and emotions consisting mainly of work-related anxiety and frustration, feelings of reaching a dead-end within their career, negative interpersonal relationships and experiences within the workplace, and the consistent consideration of a career change due to making previous incorrect job choices.

The Occupational Crisis Scale was created to assist employees in identifying whether they were in a dead-end in their career.  Three studies were performed to confirm the validity of the Occupational Crisis Scale with an assorted number of Finnish workers (53% of them female) in various occupations such as police officers, firemen, private caretakers, labor welfare advisors and nurses. 58% of individuals were ranked within the occupation crisis state based on this study and a preliminary study amongst vocation counseling clients.

To remedy these psychological issues stemming from dead-end jobs and their related work stress, vocational help can be obtained so that problems do not continue to escalate or accumulate.  For some individuals, more time may be needed to consider what they desire in their work life and the utilization of occasional sick time, education or vacation could help remedy their occupational crisis state.  For other workers, it may require a change in their work tasks, occupation within their firm, or a completely different job for them to experience a more satisfying life.  Vocational help can also assist workers with developing better coping skills which aid the individuals in handling their stresses and anxieties in all facets of life.

See also
Bullshit job
Critique of work
Freeter
McJob
Precariat
Underemployment
Tang ping ("lying flat")
Working poor

References

Further reading
, commended here by Ronald G. Ehrenberg

Employment classifications